Indira Gandhi was sworn in as Prime Minister of India for the first time on 24 January 1966. In her ministry, the ministers were as follows:

Cabinet
Key
  Died in office
  Resigned

Cabinet Ministers

|}

Ministers of State

|}

Notes

References

Indian union ministries
Indira Gandhi administration
1966 establishments in India
1971 disestablishments in India
Cabinets established in 1966
Cabinets disestablished in 1971